Sivapragasam Sivamohan is a Sri Lankan Tamil physician, politician, kallan and Member of Parliament.

Career
Sivamohan contested the 2013 provincial council election as one of the Tamil National Alliance's (TNA) candidates in Mullaitivu District and was elected to the Northern Provincial Council. After the election he was appointed to assist the Minister of Health and Indigenous Medicine on disease prevention. He took his oath as provincial councillor in front of attorney-at-law K. Thayaparan at Vavuniya on 16 October 2013.

Sivamohan was one of the TNA's candidates in Vanni District at the 2015 parliamentary election. He was elected and entered Parliament.

Electoral history

References

Eelam People's Revolutionary Liberation Front politicians
Living people
Members of the 15th Parliament of Sri Lanka
Members of the Northern Provincial Council
People from Northern Province, Sri Lanka
Sri Lankan Tamil physicians
Sri Lankan Tamil politicians
Tamil National Alliance politicians
Year of birth missing (living people)